Tiptop is an unincorporated community located in Magoffin County, Kentucky, United States. Tiptop was established as a coal mining community.

References

Unincorporated communities in Magoffin County, Kentucky
Unincorporated communities in Kentucky
Coal towns in Kentucky